Streptopus lanceolatus (rose twisted stalk, rosybells, rose mandarin, scootberry, liverberry, rose-bellwort), is an understory perennial plant native to the forests of North America, from Alaska to Labrador, south through the Great Lakes and Appalachian Mountain regions of the United States, as well as Montana, Washington state, Oregon, and St. Pierre & Miquelon. It grows primarily in mixed-wood forests, and throughout a wide range of soil and site conditions, preferring cool, acidic soils.

Streptopus lanceolatus grows from a rhizome or seed, the stem having a zigzag shape, branched or sometimes unbranched. The leaves are often finely toothed having fine hairs on the underside veins. Fruit is an elongated red berry ripening in mid-summer (July to August). If berries are consumed in quantity, diarrhea can result.

Streptopus lanceolatus can be distinguished from Solomon's seal and false Solomon's seal by the alternate leaves on a zigzag stem.

References

Liliaceae
Plants described in 1789
Flora of Canada
Flora of the United States
Flora of Saint Pierre and Miquelon